The Jonathan Green House is a historic first period Colonial American house, built c. 1700–1720. It is located at 63 Perkins Street, Stoneham, Massachusetts. It was listed on the National Register of Historic Places in 1984. It is one of the oldest structures in Stoneham, and one of only two structures in Stoneham preserving a nearly intact early eighteenth century form.

Construction history
When originally constructed, the house was a single cell: a single room of two structural bays, plus an end chimney bay with the primary entrance and staircase located in front of the chimney stack. The area to the east of the chimney was used as a stable. Currently, the main block is two and a half stories high, five bays wide, and one room deep, with a central chimney. The centered entrance was framed by simple pilasters and topped by a modest entablature (no longer extant). Single story ells project from the northeast and northwest corners.

Later history
Home to several generations of the Green family throughout the 18th and 19th centuries, its most notable resident was Capt. Jonathan Green, a prominent citizen of Stoneham, who served as town clerk and treasurer, and represented the town at a Constitutional Convention to consider a constitution reported in the summer of 1787 by the  Constitutional Convention in Philadelphia.

In 1825 and 1826 the house served as the Stoneham school house. In 1853 following the annexation of land in Stoneham to become the Melrose Highlands, this house and several others near the town line were granted the privilege of sending children occupants to school within the town of Melrose.

See also
Millard-Souther-Green House, c. 1700
National Register of Historic Places listings in Stoneham, Massachusetts
National Register of Historic Places listings in Middlesex County, Massachusetts

References

External links

Bibliography
 
 
 
 

Colonial architecture in Massachusetts
Hall and parlor houses
Houses on the National Register of Historic Places in Stoneham, Massachusetts
Houses in Stoneham, Massachusetts
National Register of Historic Places in Middlesex County, Massachusetts